"Juicy Fruit" is a song written by James Mtume and released as the lead-off single from Mtume's third album, also titled Juicy Fruit. It features lead vocals by Tawatha Agee. The mid-tempo song is Mtume's most well-known, proving enormously successful on R&B radio stations when first released.

The song reached number one on the Billboard Hot R&B Singles chart on June 4, 1983, and remained there for eight weeks. Its success on the Billboard Pop Singles chart, however, was more modest, reaching number 45. It was ranked at number 15 among the "Tracks of the Year" for 1983 by NME. Though it never reached the top 40, the single was certified as selling one million copies on July 25, 1983. The song's video had different lyrics, where they replaced "You can lick me everywhere" with "Candy kisses everywhere".

The single itself would become the inspiration for another act that would take the name from the song, Juicy, whose single "Sugar Free" was considered an answer to "Juicy Fruit" and itself the basis for being used as sampled backgrounds on numerous songs.

Background
According to group founder James Mtume, he worked on the song while lead singer Tawatha Agee was out on tour with English band Roxy Music. He had finished the Juicy Fruit album while the other band members went home. Mtume then used the Linn LM-1 and was pleased at what he heard. He then called the other band members back into the studio to complete the sessions. At 2 A.M., they completed the track in under two hours. He then called Agee, who was in London in between breaks of the Roxy Music tour. Agee then flew back to the studio, although Mtume didn't have the lyrics written down until Agee started recording. As she was recording the first verse, he was busy composing the second verse. They completed the song in one night and Agee flew back to London after the sessions. Although Mtume loved the song, Agee wasn't happy with it, as she felt her vocals were "dry".

Charts

Weekly charts

Year-end charts

Instrumental remixes

A remix of the song was made in 1983 titled the "Fruity Instrumental Mix", produced by Tony Humphries. This version of the song runs over seven minutes containing mostly instrumental beats featuring the singing vocals of "Juicy Fruit", minus its starting chorus. This is the version sampled for the Notorious B.I.G. song "Juicy", the remix of Montell Jordan's "Supa Star", and the Urban Noize remix of Nicki Minaj's song "Your Love".

The other instrumental remix titled "The After 6 Mix" runs about three and a half minutes featuring background effects and added instrument sounds. This remix also features vocals from the lead singers of "Juicy Fruit" but to a much lesser extent than in the Fruity Instrumental mix. This version is sampled in the Ant Banks song "It's Going On".

A heavily filtered disco-edit recut of "Juicy Fruit" by Adana Twins & Doctor Dru was included on Black Jukebox 01, released August 2011.

References

1983 songs
1983 singles
Epic Records singles
Funk songs
Songs written by James Mtume
Contemporary R&B ballads
1980s ballads